The Louisiana Tech Lady Techsters basketball team represents Louisiana Tech University in Ruston, Louisiana. The team currently competes in Conference USA. The current head coach of the Lady Techsters is Brooke Stoehr. Louisiana Tech has won three National Championships and has competed in 13 Final Fours, 23 Sweet Sixteens, and 27 NCAA tournaments. The Lady Techsters basketball program boasts three Wade Trophy winners, five Olympic medalists, eight members of the Women's Basketball Hall of Fame, 16 All-Americans, and 21 WNBA players. The Lady Techsters have an all-time record of 1193–387 with a .756 winning percentage, the fourth-best all-time winning percentage of any NCAA Division I program. The Lady Techsters have made 27 appearances in the NCAA Division I women's basketball tournament, which is the ninth most all-time.

History

Sonja Hogg Era (1974–1982)
In 1974, Louisiana Tech President F. Jay Taylor established the university's first women's athletic program, a women's basketball team. He hired a 28-year-old P.E. teacher at Ruston High School, Sonja Hogg, as the program's first head coach. Following 13- and 19-win seasons in 1974 and 1975, she failed to win less than 20 games in a season for the rest of her time at Louisiana Tech. The late 70s and early 80s saw much success, with Hogg leading the Lady Techsters to 4 straight Final Four appearances from 1978 to 1981, including 2 national championships in 1980 and 1981.

Hogg-Barmore Era (1982–1985)
Leon Barmore joined the Lady Techster staff in 1977 as an assistant, quickly moving up the ranks. After becoming Associate Head Coach in 1980, he was named co-head coach in 1982. With this duo leading, Tech saw continued dominance, including 3 straight trips to the NCAA tournament, 2 Final Four appearances, and 1 appearance in the final match. Following the 1985 season, Hogg left to coach at Deer Park High School, leaving Barmore solely in charge of the program.

Leon Barmore Era (1985–2002)

Following Sonja Hogg’s departure, Leon Barmore once again continued the dominance of previous years. During 16 years as the sole head coach, Barmore coached the Techsters to the NCAA tournament every season, 7 Final Four appearances, 4 more trips to the final round, and 1 additional national title during the 1987–1988 season. He also successfully navigated the Techsters through conference moves to the American South, Sun Belt, and WAC; winning 13 regular-season conference titles. Retiring after the 2001 season, Barmore had earned a coaching record of 576 wins and 87 losses, good for a win percentage of .869 and the 2nd best in basketball history. He has been inducted into both the Basketball Hall of Fame and the Women’s Basketball Hall of Fame.

Kurt Budke Era (2002–2005)
After Barmore’s retirement, Kurt Budke was named as head coach of the Lady Techsters. Budke had served as an associate head coach under Barmore since 2000 and had previously coached successfully in the NJCAA. In his 3 years as head coach, the Techsters earned 3 regular season conference titles, 2 conference tournament titles, 3 NCAA tournament appearances, and 2 Sweet Sixteen appearances. Following the 2004–2005 season, Budke was hired by Oklahoma State to fill the same position. He left Ruston with an 80–16 record.

Chris Long Era (2005–2009)
Chris Long, another assistant who had been on staff under Barmore, was named as the 4th Lady Techsters head coach in 2005. While he started his tenure continuing the dominance of previous coaches, including 2 regular season conference titles and 1 NCAA tournament appearance, he was fired halfway into the 2008–2009 season after a 12–11 start. This followed a 16–15 season in 2007–2008 where Tech failed to play in the postseason for the second season in a row. He left the Techsters with a 71–44 record.

Teresa Weatherspoon Era (2009–2014)
After Chris Long was fired midway into the 2008–2009 season, Teresa Weatherspoon was named Interim head coach, later becoming the 5th head coach of the Lady Techsters. Previously, she had played under Sonja Hogg and Leon Barmore from 1984–1988 and had been an associate head coach at Louisiana Tech since 2008. As head coach, she led the Techsters to 2 regular season conference titles, 1 conference tournament title in 2009–2010, and 2 NCAA tournament appearances. Following Louisiana Tech’s move from the WAC to Conference USA in 2013, Weatherspoon was fired after a 12–20 season where the Lady Techsters finished last in the conference.

Tyler Summitt Era (2014–2016)
Tyler Summitt was hired in 2014 following Teresa Weatherspoon’s firing. Previously he served as an assistant coach at Marquette from 2012–2014. Summitt gathered a 30–31 record during his tenure in Ruston. His time as head coach was marked by scandal, however, as news broke that he was involved in an extramarital affair with Brooke Pumroy, a player who had transferred from Marquette along with Summitt. After this affair was leaked, Summitt resigned on April 7, 2016.

Brooke Stoehr Era (2016–Present)
Brooke Stoehr was hired to be the next head coach of the Lady Techsters following Tyler Summitt’s resignation in April 2016. Previously, she coached for 4 seasons at Northwestern State. Before that, she played at Tech for 4 seasons from 1998–2002 under Leon Barmore. Currently, in her seventh season as head coach, she has led the Techsters to 4 WNIT bids, and 1 division regular season conference title.

Conference affiliations

1974–1987: Independent
1987–1991: American South Conference
1991–2001: Sun Belt Conference
2001–2013: Western Athletic Conference
2013–present: Conference USA

Seasons

Postseason results

AIAW Division I
The Lady Techsters made three appearances in the AIAW women's basketball tournament, with a combined record of 9–3.

NCAA Division I

Rivalries

Fresno State Bulldogs

LSU Lady Tigers

Tennessee Lady Vols

WKU Lady Toppers

Home venues

Thomas Assembly Center

The Thomas Assembly Center (TAC) has been home to the Lady Techsters basketball team since the 8,000-seat facility opened in November 1982. Constructed at a cost of $17.5 million, the TAC is a cylindrical arena with a concrete finish and bronze glass at the entrance level. In 2007 a new state-of-the-art maple wood floor was installed in the TAC and named "Karl Malone Court."

In the Lady Techsters' first game at the TAC, Louisiana Tech lost to USC, led by Cheryl Miller and Cynthia Cooper, 64–58 in front of 8,700 fans on December 4, 1982. However, the Lady Techsters picked up their first win at the TAC in their next game by defeating Alabama 83–56 on December 9, 1982.

On January 22, 1985, Louisiana Tech set an attendance record of 8,975 at the TAC in a women's/men's doubleheader in which the Lady Techsters defeated Northeast Louisiana 79–77 in overtime. The Lady Techsters have hosted 15 crowds of more than 7,000 and eight capacity crowds of more than 8,000. The Lady Techsters regularly rank in the Top 40 in NCAA women's basketball average attendance, including a program record average of 5,330 in 1983–84.

The Lady Techsters have been almost unbeatable at the TAC. As of the 2022–23 season, the Lady Techsters boast a 513–101 record at the TAC, a 83.6% winning percentage. The Lady Techsters have recorded thirteen undefeated seasons at the TAC, and is a perfect 36–0 all-time in NCAA tournament games there. The Lady Techsters won 161 consecutive games against unranked opponents at home from 1992 to 2004, and the Lady Techsters won 114 consecutive regular season home conference games between 1992 and 2007; and have posted home winning streaks of 49, 52 and 62 games, all of which rank in the Top 15 in Division I history.

Memorial Gymnasium
In 1952, Memorial Gymnasium, now Scotty Robertson Memorial Gymnasium, was constructed on the Louisiana Tech University campus in Ruston to serve as the home of the Louisiana Tech Bulldogs basketball. After the inception of the Lady Techsters basketball team in 1974, Memorial Gymnasium was home to Lady Techster basketball through the 1981–82 season. In the first game in program history, the Lady Techsters lost to Southeastern Louisiana 55–59 in Memorial Gym on January 7, 1975. However, in their next game, the Lady Techsters rebounded to defeat LSU 97–83 to christen Memorial Gym with the first victory in Louisiana Tech women's basketball history on January 24, 1975.

During the 1979–80 season, more than 5,000 fans routinely packed inside Memorial Gym to watch the Lady Techsters play, and Louisiana Tech's attendance peaked at 6,220 for UCLA and 6,314 for Stephen F. Austin. After that season, the Louisiana State Fire Marshall ordered Louisiana Tech to not allow more than 5,200 spectators into Memorial Gym again. If Louisiana Tech did not comply, the fire marshal vowed to personally count the crowd and not let more than 4,800 enter Memorial Gym again. As a result, Louisiana Tech President F. Jay Taylor initiated the construction of the 8,000 capacity Thomas Assembly Center.

In the Lady Techsters' final game played in Memorial Gym, Louisiana Tech defeated Kentucky 82–60 on March 20, 1982, in the Midwest regional final of the first NCAA Division I women's basketball tournament. Throughout the eight seasons the Lady Techsters played in Memorial Gymnasium, Louisiana Tech amassed 84 wins and only 6 losses at home. The Lady Techsters' 93.3% winning percentage at Memorial Gym ranks third best all-time only trailing Tennessee at Thompson–Boling Arena (94.2%) and Connecticut at Gampel Pavilion (93.7%).

Traditions

Lady Techsters

When Sonja Hogg was hired in 1974 as the first women's basketball coach, she refused to call her team the Lady Bulldogs after the Louisiana Tech men's nickname. She asserted that bulldogs were "unfeminine" and that "a lady dog is a b!+¢#." For that reason, her first initiative as head coach was to nix the nickname Bulldogs from any connection with her team. Thus, Hogg decided to change her team's nickname to the Lady Techsters.

Hogg would not allow her Lady Techsters to wear knee or elbow pads because they were unladylike. A 1986 Sports Illustrated article stated, "A Lady Techster is likely to be a good student and a devout Christian, probably favors needlepoint over Madonna tapes on airplanes and fears a drug test about as much as she does an airport metal detector." The same article stated that Hogg's insistence that her players act like ladies gave the team an "almost antebellum image" that was well-suited to a conservative town like Ruston.

Columbia Blue

In 1896, Col. A.T. Prescott, president of what was then Louisiana Polytechnic Institute, announced the selection of red and blue as the institution's colors. Red was chosen to represent courage, and blue was selected to embody loyalty. In the 1960s, Columbia blue was introduced to Louisiana Tech in various applications. In 1974, Sonja Hogg, along with the head of the university's art department, Raymond Nichols, presented various shades of blue to the athletics council, and Hogg's preference of Columbia blue was adopted as the primary color of the Lady Techsters. Prior to 2003, the university's teams, departments, and organizations used various shades of blue ranging from light blue to dark blue. Yet in 2003, Louisiana Tech standardized its shade of blue by adopting reflex blue as the official hue. However, due to Louisiana Tech's rich tradition in women's basketball, the Lady Techsters basketball team was granted the only exemption to not adopt reflex blue and was allowed to continue to use the traditional Columbia blue. While other teams have since used Columbia blue in limited capacity, the shade is still mostly synonymous with the women's basketball team.

Jersey Sleeves
In 1974, Sonja Hogg designed the Lady Techster jerseys with modest sleeves to avoid her players showing sports bra straps (or before their invention, regular bra straps) or underarms. As Lady Techster basketball rose to national prominence, the jersey sleeves became recognized as part of the Lady Techster brand. Sleeves remained a staple of the Lady Techsters jerseys throughout Leon Barmore's tenure as head coach. After Barmore retired in 2002, new head coach Kurt Budke introduced the first Lady Techsters sleeveless jerseys at the behest of the players.

Hoop Troop

Hoop Troop is the official basketball pep band at Louisiana Tech University. The Hoop Troop performs at most women's basketball home games and travels to select road basketball games. The band also usually travels to all post-season games played by the Lady Techsters, and is known nationally as one of the best basketball bands in college basketball.  In the 2005 post-season, the Hoop Troop was featured in a Sports Illustrated's College Edition article, "65 Things We Want to See During March Madness" in which states, "30) The Louisiana Tech pep band, a.k.a. the Hoop Troop, the funniest band in the land." The Hoop Troop was the only basketball band to be listed.

Players

Honors
Wade Trophy

Three Lady Techsters have been awarded the Wade Trophy, the award presented annually to the best women's basketball player in the NCAA. Connecticut is the only program to have more than three players awarded the Wade Trophy.
Pam Kelly, 1982
Janice Lawrence Braxton, 1984
Teresa Weatherspoon, 1988

Naismith Memorial Basketball Hall of Fame

Teresa Weatherspoon, inducted in 2019

Women's Basketball Hall of Fame

Pam Kelly, 2007
Janice Lawrence Braxton, 2006
Kim Mulkey, 2000
Teresa Weatherspoon, 2010
Mickie DeMoss, 2018

All-Americans

Eleven Lady Techsters have been awarded 16 Kodak First Team All-America honors.
Pam Kelly, 1980-1981-1982
Angela Turner, 1982
Janice Lawrence Braxton, 1983–1984
Pam Gant, 1985
Teresa Weatherspoon, 1987–1988
Nora Lewis, 1989
Venus Lacy, 1990
Vickie Johnson, 1995–1996
Debra Williams, 1996
Amanda Wilson, 1999
Tamicha Jackson, 2000

Conference player of the year

Fourteen Lady Techsters have garnered 19 conference player of the year honors.
Teresa Weatherspoon, 1988
Venus Lacy, 1989–1990
Shantel Hardison, 1992
Pam Thomas, 1994
Vickie Johnson, 1995–1996
Alisa Burras, 1997
Amanda Wilson, 1998–1999
Betty Lennox, 2000
Cheryl Ford, 2002–2003
Amisha Carter, 2004
Tasha Williams, 2005
Shan Moore, 2007
Shanavia Dowdell, 2009–2010
Adrienne Johnson, 2011

Olympic medalists
Lady Techsters have won five  Olympic Games medals.

Lady Techsters in the WNBA
Twenty-one former Lady Techsters have been drafted or played in the WNBA. Numerous Lady Techsters have played professional basketball overseas.

Coaches

Head coaching records

Honors
Naismith Memorial Basketball Hall of Fame

Leon Barmore, inducted in 2003

Women's Basketball Hall of Fame
Leon Barmore, inducted in 2003
Sonja Hogg, inducted in 2009
Kurt Budke, inducted in 2014

Naismith Women's College Coach of the Year
Leon Barmore: 1988

USBWA Women's National Coach of the Year
Leon Barmore: 1996

Maggie Dixon Award
Teresa Weatherspoon: 2010

Conference coach of the year
Leon Barmore: 1988, 1989, 1990, 1991, 1993, 1994, 1996, 1997, 1998, 1999
Kurt Budke: 2003, 2004
Chris Long: 2006

Leon Barmore coaching tree

Nine former assistant coaches under head coach Leon Barmore have become head women's basketball coaches.
Gary Blair: Stephen F. Austin, Arkansas, Texas A&M
Kurt Budke: Louisiana Tech, Oklahoma State
Kristy Curry: Purdue, Texas Tech, Alabama
Nell Fortner: Purdue, Team USA, Indiana Fever, Auburn
Stacy Johnson-Klein: Fresno State
Chris Long: Louisiana Tech
Kim Mulkey: Baylor, LSU
Christie Sides: Indiana Fever
Jennifer White: St. Edward's

Lady Techsters in coaching
Nine former Lady Techsters have become head women's basketball coaches.
Amy Brown: Tennessee Tech
Mickie DeMoss: Florida, Kentucky
Vickie Johnson: San Antonio Stars, Dallas Wings
Angela Lawson: Incarnate Word
Kim Mulkey: Baylor, LSU
Christie Sides: Indiana Fever
Brooke Lassiter Stoehr: Northwestern State, Louisiana Tech (current)
Teresa Weatherspoon: Louisiana Tech
Jennifer White: St. Edward's

See also
List of teams with the most victories in NCAA Division I women's college basketball
NCAA Division I women's basketball tournament bids by school
NCAA Women's Division I Basketball Championship
1981 AIAW National Division I Basketball Championship
1982 NCAA Division I women's basketball tournament
1988 NCAA Division I women's basketball tournament
AIAW women's basketball tournament
WAC women's basketball tournament
Sun Belt women's basketball tournament
Louisiana Tech Bulldogs basketball

References

External links

 
Basketball teams established in 1974
1974 establishments in Louisiana